Esbol (Esbol, ەسبول),  previously Kulagin or Kulagino (Kulagino) is a town in Atyrau Region, west Kazakhstan.

References

Atyrau Region
Cities and towns in Kazakhstan